Turkey red is a color that was widely used to dye cotton in the 18th and 19th century.  It was made using the root of the rubia plant, through a long and laborious process. It originated in India or Turkey, and was brought to Europe in the 1740s.  In France it was known as rouge d'Andrinople.

History
As the Industrial Revolution spread across Europe, chemists and manufacturers sought new red dyes that could be used for large-scale manufacture of textiles.  One popular color imported into Europe from Turkey and India in the 18th and early 19th century was Turkey red, known in France as rouge d'Andrinople.  Beginning in the 1740s, this bright red color was used to dye or print cotton textiles in England, the Netherlands and France.  Turkey red used the root of the rubia plant as the colorant, but the process was long and complicated, involving multiple soaking of the fabrics in lye, olive oil, sheep's dung, and other ingredients.  The fabric was more expensive but resulted in a fine bright and lasting red, similar to carmine, perfectly suited to cotton.  The fabric was widely exported from Europe to Africa, the Middle East and America.  In 19th-century America, it was widely used in making the traditional patchwork quilt.

The Process
The process of dyeing cotton Turkey red, as it was practiced in Turkey in the 18th century,  was described in a text by a Manchester dyer in 1786:

1. Boil cotton in lye of Barilla or wood ash
2. Wash and dry
3. Steep in a liquor of Barilla ash or soda plus sheep's dung and olive oil
4. Rinse, let stand 12 hours, dry
5. Repeat steps 3 and 4 three times.
6. Steep in a fresh liquor of Barilla ash or soda, sheep's dung, olive oil and white argol (potassium tartrate).
7. Rinse and dry
8. Repeat steps 6 and 7 three times.
9. Treat with gall nut solution
10. Wash and dry
11. Repeat steps 9 and 10 once.
12. Treat with a solution of alum, or alum mixed with ashes  and Saccharum Saturni (lead acetate).
13. Dry, wash, dry.
14. Madder once or twice with Turkey madder to which a little sheep's blood is added.
15. Wash
16. Boil in a lye made of soda ash or the dung liquor
17. Wash and dry.

See also
 Salu (cloth), a turkey red colored cloth.

Notes

References
Sarah Lowengard (2006), The Creation of Color in 18th Century Europe,Columbia University Press. (www.gutenberg-e.org/lowengard).

External links
 

Shades of red